The Hausruckviertel (literally German for the Hausruck quarter or district) is an Austrian region belonging to the state of Upper Austria: it is one of four "quarters" of Upper Austria the others being Traunviertel, Mühlviertel, and Innviertel. It is so-called because of the range of hills, the Hausruck, that pass through the region.

Major towns in Hausruckviertel include Wels, Eferding, Grieskirchen and Vöcklabruck.

Geography of Upper Austria